The Russia men's national under-19 volleyball team represents Russia in international men's volleyball competitions and friendly matches under the age 19 and it is ruled by the Russian Volleyball Federation body that is an affiliate of the Federation of International Volleyball FIVB and also part of the European Volleyball Confederation CEV.

In response to the 2022 Russian invasion of Ukraine, the International Volleyball Federation suspended all Russian national teams, clubs, and officials, as well as beach and snow volleyball athletes, from all events. The European Volleyball Confederation (CEV) also banned all Russian national teams, clubs, and officials from participating in European competition, and suspended all members of Russia from their respective functions in CEV organs.

Results

Summer Youth Olympics
 Champions   Runners up   Third place   Fourth place

FIVB U19 World Championship
 Champions   Runners up   Third place   Fourth place

Europe U19 / U18 Championship
 Champions   Runners up   Third place   Fourth place

Team

Current squad
The following is the Russian roster in the 2019 FIVB Volleyball Boys' U19 World Championship.

Head Coach: Mikhail Nikolaev

References

External links
 Official website 

National men's under-19 volleyball teams
U
Volleyball in Russia